The Gallant Blade is a 1948 American Cinecolor adventure film directed by Henry Levin and starring Larry Parks as a peasant hero of France in the 17th century after the Thirty Years' War.

Cast
Larry Parks as Lt. David Picard
Marguerite Chapman as Nanon de Lartigues
Victor Jory as Marshall Mordore
George Macready as General Cadeau
Edith King as Madame Chauvignac
Michael Duane as Paul Brissac
Onslow Stevens as General de la Garance
Peter Brocco as Sgt. Jacques
Tim Huntley as Mayor Lanier
Ross Ford as Henri

Production
Columbia announced in 1945 they would make The Gallant Blade based on a short story by Alexander Dumas. It was to be a follow up to The Fighting Guardsman. It was part of a boom in swashbuckling pictures in 1945.

The film was not made immediately. In 1947 Irving Starr was announced as producer and Charles Vidor as director. Then Vidor was replaced by Henry Levin. Larry Parks was signed to star. He had just made a swashbuckler for Columbia, The Swordsman, then initiated legal proceedings against the studio in July to get out of this contract with them. Parks had refused payment since then; he agreed to be paid for The Gallant Blade on the proviso it did not affect his legal actions.

Filming started 1 December 1947. It was also known as The Gay Blade.

References

External links

1948 films
American swashbuckler films
Films directed by Henry Levin
Films set in the 17th century
Films set in France
American historical adventure films
1940s historical adventure films
Columbia Pictures films
Cinecolor films
1940s American films